Lesnoye Sanatorium is the oldest medical institution in the city of Tolyatti, Russia. Its main focus is tuberculosis treatment.

History

Before 1917

Lesnoye Sanatorium was founded in 1910 by the Stavropol-on-Volga merchant and entrepreneur V. N. Klimushin (Stavropol-on-Volga being the former name of Tolyatti). The original building was a two-story building of brick and timber, with stove heating. The newspapers announcing the opening of the health resort noted that medicinal kumis (fermented horse milk) was to be a feature of the therapeutic regime. Vladimir B. Zolotnitsky, a tuberculosis specialist and well-known public figure, was appointed chief physician and the first tuberculosis patients were admitted.

The sanatorium applied advanced (for the time) methods of treatment, including the Mantoux test and electrification. There were laboratories and a sunroom.

Out on the steppe far from the Lesnoye Sanatorium was a farm where two hundred horses were kept to provide mare's milk. From this was made the sanatorium's therapeutic beverage – kumis. During the holiday season up to 45,000 bottles of kumis were produced, not only for use by the sanatorium but also for sale.

Patients came from all over Russia – mostly the wealthy, as the fee for a season was 200 silver rubles. The health resort became famous, attracting aristocrats from Turkey and France. The health resort was well-appointed, with flower gardens, sculptures, fountains, and gazebos. There were electric lights and water from an artesian well. Horse-drawn carriages were available for hire.

In 1913, the sanatorium treated the French communist Inessa Armand. In 1967 a memorial plaque with her name was placed, lost when the building was renovated.

During World War I, the Lesnoye Sanatorium was used as a rehabilitation hospital for wounded soldiers and officers.

In Soviet times
In 1918, the sanatorium was nationalized and given over to the Stavropol-on-Volga district health department. In the 1920s and 1930s outbreaks of tuberculosis were common throughout Russia, and the sanatorium became the base from which the Moscow tuberculosis clinics were supervised, and was itself filled to capacity. Surgical methods of treatment and more effective use of kumis were developed here.

During World War II the Military Institute of Foreign Languages moved to Stavropol-on-Volga, and a training center for military translators was established at the Lesnoye Sanatorium under the direction of Lieutenant General Nikolai Biasi. From 1941 to 1942 two thousand translators were trained. Among the cadets trained here were many who became well-known writers, artists and composers, including Vladimir Etush, Andrei Eshpai, S. Lvov, E. Rzhevskaya, and A. Troyanovsky.

After the war, Lesnoye Sanatorium began accepting patients again, but only in the summer. In 1950 about 100 patients were admitted. Year-round operations resumed in 1960, and patients came for treatment from all over the USSR.

In 1980, a large (not including pedestal and base) statue of Lenin which had been installed on the grounds was moved to Central Park to increase its public visibility.

In 1989 a modern seven-story building with 360 beds and kitchens, a dining room, a recreation center, a movie theater, and other services was commissioned.

Recent history and current status
Tuberculosis patients from all regions of Russia continue to be treated at Lesnoye Sanatorium, which is now owned and operated by the Russian federal government. The current capacity is 360 beds. The main methods of treatment are medication, diet, and kumis.

Today, the kumis is made from cow's milk. It is slightly inferior in its medicinal properties to natural mare's kumis. In 1996, a private goat farm was established on the grounds of the sanatorium, to provide goat's milk for medicinal purposes to patients of the sanatorium and to children in the city.

In 1993, the facade and grounds of the Lesnoye Sanatorium were declared a monument of architecture and history of the Samara region, and they are included in the official register of monuments of Tolyatti. A picture of Lesnoye Sanatorium is on the labels of the local brandy "Stavropol-on-Volga".

Lesnoye Sanatorium celebrated its centennial in 2010. A forest fire, one of the many 2010 Russian wildfires of that hot dry summer, destroyed large swaths of the surrounding forest. The sanatorium was saved, but was closed from July 30, 2010 to December 10, 2010. Another huge forest fire broke out near the sanatorium in July 2021.

External links
Website of the Lesnoye Sanatorium 
Another website of the Lesnoye Sanatorium 
Lesnoye Sanatorium at Monuments of Tolyatti

References

1910 establishments in the Russian Empire
Hospital buildings completed in 1910
Hospital buildings completed in 1989
Hospitals in Russia
Hospitals established in 1910
Hospitals built in the Russian Empire
Hospitals built in the Soviet Union
Buildings and structures in Tolyatti
Tuberculosis sanatoria
Companies nationalised by the Soviet Union